Marcel Mehlem (born 1 March 1995) is a German professional footballer who plays as a defensive midfielder for 2. Bundesliga side SV Sandhausen, on loan from  club SC Paderborn.

Career statistics

References

1995 births
Living people
People from Germersheim
German footballers
Footballers from Rhineland-Palatinate
Association football midfielders
2. Bundesliga players
3. Liga players
Challenger Pro League players
Karlsruher SC II players
Karlsruher SC players
Royale Union Saint-Gilloise players
SC Paderborn 07 players
SV Sandhausen players
German expatriate footballers
German expatriate sportspeople in Belgium
Expatriate footballers in Belgium